William R. Devlin (born c. 1947) is an American politician in the state of North Dakota. He is a member of the North Dakota House of Representatives, representing the 23rd district. A Republican, he was first elected in 2010 and also served from 1997 to 2005. He is an alumnus of Mayville State College and former newspaper publisher. Devlin is a former president of the North Dakota Newspaper Association. During his first stint in the House of Representatives, he was the Majority Party Caucus Leader for one year in 1999. He was named Speaker of the North Dakota House of Representatives in 2013. On September 10, 2013 he met with Jack J. C. Yang of the Taipei Economic and Cultural Office in Kansas City.

References

1940s births
Living people
Year of birth uncertain
People from Steele County, North Dakota
Republican Party members of the North Dakota House of Representatives
Mayville State University alumni
Speakers of the North Dakota House of Representatives
21st-century American politicians